Malin Larsson (née Lindberg; born 1980) is a Swedish politician and member of the Riksdag, the national legislature. A member of the Social Democratic Party, she has represented Västernorrland County since September 2018.

Larsson is the daughter of site manager Olle Lindberg and nurse Sonja Lindberg (née Wennberg). She was educated in Matfors and Sundsvall. She has a master's degree from Umeå University and a political science degree from Mid Sweden University. She has worked as shop worker, substitute teacher and bank clerk. She has bben a member of the municipal council in Sundsvall Municipality since 2010.

References

1980 births
Living people
Members of the Riksdag 2018–2022
Members of the Riksdag 2022–2026
Members of the Riksdag from the Social Democrats
Mid Sweden University alumni
People from Sundsvall Municipality
Umeå University alumni
Women members of the Riksdag
21st-century Swedish women politicians